Haritina may refer to:

 7101 Haritina, an asteroid
 Haritina Korotkevich (1882–1904), Russian soldier
 A transliteration variant of Charitina

See also
 Hariotina, a genus of green algae in the family Scenedesmaceae